Johannes van Overbeek (born April 14, 1973) is a Belgian-American former race car driver in the WeatherTech SportsCar Championship. He most recently drove a Nissan Onroak DPi for Extreme Speed Motorsports.

Career

Van Overbeek raced go-karts as a child, and began racing sedans at eighteen. Since 1996, he has competed in several racing series in North America, including the Speed World Challenge, the American Le Mans Series, and Grand-Am. In 2007, Van Overbeek won the Porsche Cup award as the top non-factory Porsche driver in the world. He finished third in 2008. As of 2013, Van Overbeek has eight wins in the ALMS. He was the only driver in ALMS to finish in the top three of the driver's championship every year from 2004 to 2008. In 2009 Van Overbeek drove for Flying Lizard Motorsports. He switched to Extreme Speed Motorsports for 2010. With co-driver Scott Sharp, van Overbeek finished 2nd in the 2012 ALMS GT championship in a Ferrari 458 GT2 with 2 wins for ESM. Van Overbeek has competed in four 24 Hours of Le Mans races, finishing sixth in GT2 in 2008, fourth in 2006, and third in 2005.

Van Overbeek lives in Oakland, California with his wife and two sons.

24 Hours of Le Mans results

WeatherTech SportsCar Championship results
(key)(Races in bold indicate pole position, Results are overall/class)

Notes

References

External links
IMSA page

1973 births
American racing drivers
American people of Dutch descent
Living people
American Le Mans Series drivers
Rolex Sports Car Series drivers
24 Hours of Daytona drivers
24 Hours of Le Mans drivers
Sportspeople from Oakland, California
Racing drivers from San Francisco
Racing drivers from Sacramento, California
WeatherTech SportsCar Championship drivers
FIA World Endurance Championship drivers
12 Hours of Sebring drivers

Extreme Speed Motorsports drivers